Ysgol Dyffryn Aman is a bilingual (Welsh and English) comprehensive school and VI form. On average, it has about 2000 pupils. It is located on Margaret Street, Ammanford, Carmarthenshire in Wales.

Admissions
It is a mixed-gender non-denominational secondary school.

The school is situated in the north of the Ammanford town centre, while the town itself is a few miles north-east of the western terminus of the M4.

History
The school was formerly known as Amman Valley Comprehensive School (AVCS), prior to which it was the Amman Valley Grammar School. It originally opened as Amman Valley County School in 1913, while a new school was built, opening 19 January 1928. In 1970, Amman Valley Grammar School and Amman Valley Secondary Modern School merged. The school adopted a bilingual name, Ysgol Dyffryn Aman / Amman Valley School, prior to 2011. Following education reform in the Dinefwr area, the board of governors unanimously voted in favour of changing the name to Ysgol Dyffryn Aman. The school is now known by its Welsh name only and this is the form used on all official literature, signs and documents.

Estyn reports

In regard to demographics, 41% of pupils come from homes where Welsh is the main language, with 49% being able to speak Welsh to first language standard.

Alumni
Owain Jones (footballer, born 1996), footballer
Jac Morgan, rugby player
 Emyr Wyn Lewis, rugby player
 Adam Price, leader of Plaid Cymru, AS from 2016 - for Carmarthen East and Dinefwr (Senedd) and MP from 2001 to 2010 for Carmarthen East and Dinefwr (Westminster) 
 Shane Williams, rugby player
 Trefor Evans, rugby player (Sand Valley Grammar School)
 Lee Waters, Welsh Labour AM from 2016 – for Llanelli
 Owain Wyn Evans, journalist and broadcaster
 Steve Phillips, Chief Executive Officer, Welsh Rugby Union

Amman Valley Grammar School
 Donald Arthur, professor of zoology and head of department from 1963 to 1980 at King's College London
 John Cale, musician and founder member of The Velvet Underground
 Sir Goronwy Daniel, vice-chancellor from 1977 to 1979 of the University of Wales, and principal from 1969 to 1979 of Aberystwyth University 
 Albert Davies, chief agricultural officer from 1971 to 1979 at the Agricultural Development and Advisory Service
 Dai Davies, footballer
 Berian Evans, Violist (Alberni Quartet)
 Neil Hamilton, Conservative MP from 1983 to 1997 for Tatton
 Alun Jones, chief executive from 1990 to 2002 of the Institute of Physics
 Derec Llwyd Morgan, vice-chancellor from 1995 to 2004 of Aberystwyth University
 Roy Noble, broadcaster
 Eric Sunderland, vice-chancellor from 1989 to 1991 of the University of Wales, vice-chancellor from 1984 to 1995 of Bangor University (then University College of North Wales, Bangor), professor of anthropology from 1971 to 1984 at Durham University, president from 1989 to 1991 of the Royal Anthropological Institute of Great Britain and Ireland, and Lord Lieutenant of Gwynedd from 2000 to 2005
 Don Tarr, rugby player
 Roger Thomas, Labour MP from 1979 to 1987 for Carmarthen
Alan Watkins, journalist
 Wynford Williams, chief executive from 2001 to 2006 of the United Kingdom Hydrographic Office, and president from 2007 to 2008 of the Institute of Marine Engineering, Science and Technology
Dr. Richard Francis, Semiconductor Inventor/Developer

References

External links 
 www.dyffrynaman.co.uk/ (Official Site)
 Parched pob byw ei orchwyl (Our Motto)
 Amman Valley Comprehensive School League Table Performance From BBC News
 History of the school
 EduBase

Secondary schools in Carmarthenshire
Educational institutions established in 1928
1928 establishments in Wales